Kampala–Busunju Expressway is a planned road in the Central Region of Uganda. The road would connect the county's capital city, Kampala, to the town of Busunju in Mityana District.

Location
The expressway would start at the Namungoona roundabout on the Kampala Northern Bypass Highway and proceed in a northwesterly direction through Nansana, Wakiso and Kakiri in Wakiso District, to end at Busunju, in Mityana District, a distance of approximately

Background
The proposed expressway forms part of Kampala–Hoima Road. As at February 2016, the existing road between Kampala and Busunju is a bitumen-surfaced, two lane road in deteriorating condition. The road is congested and accident prone.

Expansion to expressway
As part of efforts to decongest Kampala, and as part of efforts to develop road infrastructure to the oil-rich Albertine region, the government of Uganda plans to expand this road from two lanes to a four-lane dual carriageway. Bids have been advertised for a consultant to carry out a feasibility study, design the expressway and perform an environment impact assessment. A public-private partnership arrangement is planned in developing and funding the expressway.

References

External links
 Uganda National Road Authority Homepage
 Government Seeks to Widen Road Reserves to 8 Meters

Roads in Uganda
Kampala District
Mityana District
Wakiso District